John Hacket (Born Halket) (1 September 1592 – 28 October 1670) was an English churchman, Bishop of Lichfield and Coventry from 1661 until his death.

Life

He was born in London and educated at Westminster and Trinity College, Cambridge. On taking his degree he was elected a fellow of his college, and soon afterwards wrote the comedy, Loiola (London, 1648), which was twice performed before King James I. He was ordained in 1618, and through the influence of John Williams became rector in 1621 of Stoke Hammond, Buckinghamshire, and Kirkby Underwood, Lincolnshire.

In 1623 he was chaplain to James, and in 1624 Williams gave him the livings of St Andrew's, Holborn, and Cheam, Surrey. He was Archdeacon of Bedford from 1631 to 1661.

When the so-called Root and Branch Bill was before Parliament in 1641, Hacket was selected to plead in the House of Commons for the continuance of cathedral establishments. In 1645 his living of St Andrew's was sequestered, but he was allowed to retain the other, ceding it for practical reasons in 1662.

On the accession of Charles II, his fortunes improved; he frequently preached before the king, and was elected Bishop of Lichfield and Coventry after the bishopric was rejected by the Presbyterian leader Edmund Calamy the elder. Hacket was elected to the See on 6 December, confirmed on 20 December, and consecrated a bishop on 22 December 1661. His time at the Cathedral coming immediately after the English Civil War meant that Hacket had the unenviable task of overseeing the restoration of Lichfield Cathedral.

He has a near life-size effigy at rest over marble plaques in Lichfield Cathedral.

Works

His best-known book is the biography of his patron, Archbishop Williams, entitled Scrinia reserata: a Memorial offered to the great Deservings of John Williams, D.D. (London, 1693).

References

External links

1592 births
1670 deaths
People educated at Westminster School, London
Westminster Divines
Alumni of Trinity College, Cambridge
Bishops of Lichfield
Archdeacons of Bedford
17th-century Church of England bishops